Peter Horňák (born 24 May 1964) is a Slovak water polo player. He competed in the men's tournament at the 1992 Summer Olympics.

References

1964 births
Living people
Slovak male water polo players
Olympic water polo players of Czechoslovakia
Water polo players at the 1992 Summer Olympics
Sportspeople from Bratislava